Giti Pashaei Tehrani (sometimes spelt Giti Pashayi; June 13, 1940 – May 7, 1995) was an Iranian singer and musician. Pashaei was one of the most popular Iranian singers of the late 1960s and 1970s.

Biography
Giti Pashaei was born on June 13, 1940, in Tehran, Iran. She inherited her passion for music from her grandfather, Jafar Mansoori, who was known as a poet and musician. Her early life was spent attending the master-classes of such musicians as Faramarz Payvar and Mehdi Forough. She continued her education in New York City, where she obtained a diploma in architecture and also studied orchestration and harmony and became a composer.

In 1979, Islamic Revolution put an end to her singing career. Women were forbidden to sing in public. Later on, she composed many soundtracks for Iranian movies after the revolution in 1979. As a composer, most of the time she worked with her husband Masoud Kimiai, a film director, whom she married in 1969.

Personal life

Giti married to Masoud Kimiai, an Iranian film director, in 1969. In the late 1980s, she moved to Hamburg, Germany, where she researched Western Church and Baroque music. The couple separated in 1991, and have a son Poulad Kimiayi, a pianist, who was born on 14 July in 1980.

She died of breast cancer in Tehran on 7 May 1995. Her songs and compositions are still heard abroad.

Works

Discography
Miravam & Ye Del Daraam (1969)
Be Man Nakhand & Nemikham Doroogh Begi (1969)
Tasbih-e Sad Dooneh & Gol-e Maryam (1971)
Shadi Ba Man Ghahre & Rizeh Rizeh, (album, Persian, 1971)Ki Migeh Donya Ghashange & Heyfe Harf-e Mano Del Tamoom Besheh (1972)Mageh Mano Khaab Bebini & Ey Vaay Ey Vaay (1973)Arezooha (1976)Ghoroobe & Khoda Mehrabooneh (1976)

Memorable songsGol-e MaryamMolanaShirin SokhanBot-e AyyarLili HozakKanizCompilation
 Arezooha (1995)
 Gole Maryam (1996)
 Rangarang: Pre-revolutionary Iranian Pop (2011, as co-artist)

Filmography
as actorSafar sang (The Journey of the Stone, 1978), as Fatemeh

as composer
 Blade and Silk (1986)
 Tigh o abrisham (1987)
 Sorb (The Lead, 1989), as Giti Pashayi
 The Snake Fang (1989)
 Goroohban (The Sergeant'', 1991), as Giti Pashayi

References

External links

1948 births
1995 deaths
Singers from Tehran
20th-century Iranian women singers
Iranian women pop singers
Iranian film score composers
20th-century women composers
Deaths from cancer in Iran
Deaths from breast cancer
Burials at artist's block of Behesht-e Zahra